"Outside Today" is a song by American rapper YoungBoy Never Broke Again, released as the lead single from his debut album Until Death Call My Name. The song, produced by DMacTooBangin, was released on January 6, 2018, along with its music video. It peaked at number 31 on the Billboard Hot 100, becoming NBA YoungBoy's highest-charting song until the release of "Bandit" with Juice WRLD, which peaked in the top 10 in October 2019.

Music video
The song's music video features NBA YoungBoy staying inside of his home and avoiding a swarm of paparazzi with his then-girlfriend Jania, crew, and Birdman.

Charts

Weekly charts

Year-end charts

Certifications

References

2018 singles
2018 songs
Trap music songs
YoungBoy Never Broke Again songs
Atlantic Records singles
Songs written by YoungBoy Never Broke Again